Ysgol Bro Pedr is a mixed middle school for pupils aged 3–19. The school is situated in Lampeter, Ceredigion, Wales. The school is a product of the amalgamation of Ysgol Gynradd Ffynonbedr primary school and Ysgol Gyfun Llanbedr Pont Steffan secondary school.

The school is categorized linguistically by Welsh Government as a category 2B school, meaning that at least 80% of subjects (except Welsh and English) are taught through the medium of Welsh but are also taught through the medium of English. 37% of pupils came from Welsh-speaking homes in 2016.

Notable former pupils 
 Rhodri Gomer-Davies, rugby union player
 Ben Lake, Plaid Cymru politician 
 Elin Jones, Plaid Cymru politician and Llywydd of the Senedd
 Gillian Elisa, actress

References 

Secondary schools in Ceredigion